Marie Rose sauce (known in some areas as cocktail sauce or seafood sauce) is a British  condiment often made from a blend of tomatoes, mayonnaise, Worcestershire sauce, lemon juice and black pepper. A simpler version can be made by merely mixing tomato ketchup with mayonnaise. The sauce was popularised in the 1960s by Fanny Cradock, a British celebrity chef.

It is often used to accompany seafood; prawns in particular.

Origins
The sauce is often credited to Fanny Cradock, who made it widely known. Variations exist internationally, and seafood cocktail sauces predate Cradock's 1967 recipe by some years. For example, Constance Spry published a recipe for Tomato Ice, a chilled mixture of mayonnaise and sweetened tomato pulp, in 1956 for use as the base of a prawn cocktail.

The American cocktail sauce is a horseradish and ketchup-based sauce that is served with seafood, and dates back considerably earlier. Although this is not the same sauce as Marie Rose, it is served in the same distinctive style in a prawn or shrimp cocktail, and it has been suggested that US cocktail sauce, made milder for British tastes, was the precursor of Marie Rose sauce.

The connection with the name Marie Rose is also not clear. Cradock is sometimes credited with the name, or there is an association with the British warship the Mary Rose. However, the Mary Rose Trust itself has debunked this, saying "As we still have a number of divers on our team who were around during this period, so we can ask them. Not one of them has any recollection of this happening... since the Mary Rose was in the news a lot during this period, it becomes clear that some people did the sums and came up with a nice story to justify the result."

Similar sauces

Argentina 
In Argentina, salsa golf is a similar sauce created in the 1920s at a golf course, hence the name.

United States

In the United States, a similar sauce, fry sauce, is sometimes served with french fries. Another similar sauce called Thousand Island dressing is popular in the United States and Canada. The Thousand Island dressing recipe reputedly originated from the Thousand Islands between the state of New York and the province of Ontario.

Ireland
In Ireland, Marie Rose sauce refers primarily to just ketchup and mayonnaise, and often salt and pepper. Marie Rose sauce in chip shops is usually known as "burger sauce", though there are many names in use. However, the above British versions are also used in Ireland. The name used is dependent on where it is being served (e.g. chip shop) and what the sauce is accompanying (such as chips or salad). More formal recipes may also incorporate ingredients such as horseradish, herbs, and Irish brandy.

Some restaurants may top or accompany Marie Rose sauce with Irish cheddar cheese.

See also
 Cocktail sauce
 Fry sauce
 List of dips
 Pink sauce
 List of sauces

References

Sources
 Marie Rose sauce recipe
 BBC - recipe includes a description of Marie Rose sauce

British condiments
Fish products